The Deansboro Railroad Station is a late nineteenth-century train depot in the hamlet of Deansboro in Oneida County, New York. It is historically significant for its role in the history of railroads in New York State and for its related characteristic architecture.

It was built by a predecessor railroad to the New York, Ontario and Western Railway. The depot is a one-story rectangular wood-frame building. It served the local community from 1867 until it was sold by the railroad in 1957.

It was listed on the National Register of Historic Places in 2002. There are plans to turn the depot into a museum.

Gallery

References

Railway stations on the National Register of Historic Places in New York (state)
Railway stations in the United States opened in 1867
National Register of Historic Places in Oneida County, New York
Former railway stations in New York (state)
Former New York, Ontario and Western Railway stations